Jošt Zakrajšek (born 26 June 1983) is a Slovenian male canoeist who won a Wildwater Canoeing World Cup in C1.

Biography
In addition to having won a World Cup in wildwater, he has participated in the world or European championships in all four disciplines of canoeing (winning medals in three of these), slalom and wildwater in whitewater and sprint and marathon in flatwater, in addition to competing with both canoe, Canadian and kayak.

Achievements

References

External links
 
 Jošt Zakrajšek at Canoe Results
   

1983 births
Living people
Slovenian male canoeists
Competitors at the 2013 Mediterranean Games
Mediterranean Games silver medalists for Slovenia
Mediterranean Games medalists in canoeing
Canoeists at the 2015 European Games
Canoeists at the 2019 European Games
European Games competitors for Slovenia